Hernán Téllez was a Chilean swimmer. He competed in the men's 400 metre freestyle event at the 1928 Summer Olympics.

References

External links
 

Year of birth missing
Possibly living people
Chilean male freestyle swimmers
Olympic swimmers of Chile
Swimmers at the 1928 Summer Olympics
Place of birth missing